Warnia is a Polish coat of arms. It was used by several szlachta families in the times of the Polish–Lithuanian Commonwealth.

History

Blazon

Notable bearers
Notable bearers of this coat of arms include:
 Ćwirko-Godycki Michał (1901–1980), Polish anthropologist. Professor at the Adam Mickiewicz University and the academy of physical education in Poznań. Author of many academic works.

See also
 Polish heraldry
 Heraldry
 Coat of arms

Bibliography
 Andrzej Kulikowski: Wielki herbarz rodów polskich. Warszawa: Świat Książki, 2005, s. 356. .

Polish coats of arms